Circle in the Square Theatre School is a non-profit, tax exempt drama school associated with Circle in the Square Theatre; it is the only accredited conservatory attached to a Broadway theatre.

It offers two 2-year full-time programs: a Professional Theatre Workshop, and a Professional Musical Theatre Workshop. The musical theatre program is unique in that it's identical to the acting program, except for additional musical classes. This gives the musical theatre students important, deep acting training so they can graduate as true, professional triple threats. There is also an option to earn a joint BFA in Theatre or Musical Theatre with Eckerd College in Florida. 

Additionally, Circle offers seven-week summer intensives for acting and musical theatre students.

Circle in the Square Theatre School's primary objective is to train actors and singers for work in professional theatre, film, and television; it utilizes an eclectic curriculum to expose the students to various acting styles, methods, and techniques.

Theodore Mann started the highly selective school in 1961 with 15 students in a Greenwich Village venue on Bleecker Street when Circle in the Square Theatre was an Off-Broadway venue. In 1972, it moved to its current Broadway location in the Paramount Plaza. Its student body is now approximately 75 students. Jacqueline Brookes, the Broadway actor, was a member of the faculty from 1973 until her death in April 2013.

Circle in the Square Theatre School offers its students the rare opportunity to train and perform in the Broadway Theatre, and see the shows at Circle for free.

Notable alumni
The school site lists the following alumni.

Mili Avital
Kevin Bacon
Elise Bauman
John Bolger
Lani Brockman
Richard Brooks
Woody Brown
Greg Bryk
Kevin Cahoon
Rachel Chagall
Sarah Clarke
Ed Clements
Viola Davis
Shae D'lyn
Benicio del Toro
Lisa Edelstein
Lisa Emery
Linda Fiorentino
Patrick Fischler
Lady Gaga
Amy Gaipa
Barbara Garrick
Gina Gershon
Amanda Green
Page Hannah
Cecil Hoffman
Philip Seymour Hoffman
Winnie Holzman
Felicity Huffman
Rick Hurst
Kristen Johnston
Denis Jones
Jonathan Judge-Russo
Justin Kirk
Michael E. Knight
Jonathan LaPaglia
Jill Larson
Matthew Lillard
Jessica Lundy
Alec Mapa
Andrew McCarthy
John C. McGinley
Idina Menzel
Michelle Monaghan
Kate O'Toole
Ken Olin
Nicole Ari Parker
Steven Peterman
Robert Picardo
Michael Rispoli
Thomas Sadoski
Dahlia Salem
Jana Schneider
Molly Shannon
Rondell Sheridan
Zenobia Shroff
Peter Stebbings
Amy Stiller
D. B. Sweeney
Maura Tierney
Nancy Travis
Marco Zunino
Arnetia Walker
Kevin Weisman
Kate Wetherhead
John Whitesell

References

External links
 circlesquare.org

Broadway theatre
 
Drama schools in the United States
Schools of the performing arts in the United States
Educational institutions established in 1961
1961 establishments in New York City
Organizations based in Manhattan
501(c)(3) organizations